"Comin' Back to Me" is a psychedelic folk song by the American rock band Jefferson Airplane. It was written by Marty Balin. The song appeared on Jefferson Airplane's second album, Surrealistic Pillow. Marty Balin recalls that "the song was created while he indulged in some primo-grade marijuana given to him by blues singer Paul Butterfield."  After writing the song in one sitting, he immediately went to the studio to record his composition with any available musicians at the studio. The song would later be covered by Rickie Lee Jones and Richie Havens.

It has appeared on the soundtrack of a number of American feature films including Flashback (1990), The Indian Runner (1991), Ace Ventura: Pet Detective (1994), Without Limits (1998), Girl, Interrupted (1999), Moonlight Mile (2002), A Serious Man (2009), and The Age of Adaline (2015).

Personnel
 Jerry Garcia – guitar
 Marty Balin – lead vocals, guitar
 Paul Kantner – guitar
 Jack Casady – guitar
 Grace Slick – recorder

The mono mix of this song brings out a bass guitar part that, presumably, would have been played by Jack Casady.

Cover versions
Balin released a new version on his 1999 solo album Marty Balin Greatest Hits.
In 1991, Rickie Lee Jones covered the song on her album Pop Pop''.

References

1967 songs
Songs written by Marty Balin
Jefferson Airplane songs
Song recordings produced by Rick Jarrard
Rock ballads